The 1967–68 season was the 65th season of competitive football in Belgium. RSC Anderlechtois won their 14th and 5th consecutive Division I title. For the first time ever, a club would win 5 consecutive Belgian championships. RSC Anderlechtois entered the 1967–68 European Champion Clubs' Cup as Belgian title holder and Standard Liège the 1967–68 European Cup Winners' Cup as the Cup holder. RFC Brugeois (2nd), RFC Liégeois (3rd) and R Antwerp FC (5th) all played the 1967–68 Inter-Cities Fairs Cup. RFC Brugeois won the Belgian Cup final against R Beerschot AC (1-1 after extra time, 8–6 on penalties). The Belgium national football team ended their 1968 UEFA Euro qualification campaign at the 2nd place of Group 7 behind France and thus did not qualify for the second round. They also started their 1970 FIFA World Cup qualification campaign with a win against Finland.

Overview
At the end of the season, R Antwerp FC and OC Charleroi were relegated to Division II and were replaced by ARA La Gantoise and RU Saint-Gilloise from Division II.
The bottom 2 clubs in Division II (KRC Mechelen and RC Tirlemont) were relegated to Division III, to be replaced by KFC Turnhout and RCS Brugeois from Division III.
The bottom club of each Division III league (KS Houthalen, R Stade Waremmien FC, RAA Louviéroise and SV Oudenaarde) were relegated to Promotion, to be replaced by KSC Menen, KSC Maccabi Voetbal Antwerp, RCS La Forestoise and FC Witgoor Sport Dessel from Promotion.

National team

* Belgium score given first

Key
 H = Home match
 A = Away match
 N = On neutral ground
 F = Friendly
 ECQ = European Championship qualification
 WCQ = World Cup qualification
 o.g. = own goal

European competitions
RSC Anderlechtois beat Karl-Marx-Stadt of East Germany in the first round of the 1967–68 European Champion Clubs' Cup (won 3–1 away, 2–1 at home) but were eliminated in the second round by Sparta Prague of Czechoslovakia (lost 2–3 away, drew 3–3 at home).

Standard Liège defeated Altay SK of Turkey in the first round of the 1967–68 European Cup Winners' Cup (won 3–2 away, drew 0–0 at home).
In the second round, Standard eliminated Aberdeen FC of Scotland (won 3–0 at home, lost 0–2 away).
In the quarter-finals they lost to Milan AC of Italy (both legs were drawn 1-1, the second after extra time, but the Italians won a play-off game 2–0.

Three Belgian clubs entered the 1967–68 Inter-Cities Fairs Cup: in the first round, RFC Liégeois beat PAOK FC of Greece (won 2–0 away, 3–2 at home), but R Antwerp FC lost to Göztepe AŞ (lost 1–2 at home, drew 0–0 away) and RFC Brugeois lost to Sporting of Portugal (drew 0–0 at home, lost 1–2 away).
RFC Liégeois then lost in the second round to Dundee FC of Scotland (lost 1–3 away, 1–4 at home).

Honours

Final league tables

Premier Division

 1967-68 Top scorer: Roger Claessen (Standard) and Paul Van Himst (RSC Anderlechtois) with 20 goals
 1967 Golden Shoe: Fernand Boone (RFC Brugeois)

References